Shirley Jaffe may refer to:

 Shirley Jaffe (artist) (1923–2016), American abstract painter
 Shirley Jaffe (actress), British actress